Fomenko is a (Cyrillic: Фоменко) is a Russian-language surname that corresponds to the Ukrainian surname Khomenko (Cyrillic: Хоменко) derived from the given name Khoma, or Thomas.  The Russian form is derived from the corresponding name Foma.

Notable people with this surname include:

Anatoly Fomenko, Russian mathematician and topologist, known for his work on historical revisionism
Arturas Fomenko, Lithuanian football player
Mykhailo Fomenko, Ukrainian football coach and former player
Nikolai Fomenko, Russian rock musician and motor racer
Pavel Fomenko, Russian high jumper
Serhiy Fomenko, Ukrainian singer
Yuliya Fomenko, Russian backstroke swimmer

See also
 

Russian-language surnames
Ukrainian-language surnames
Patronymic surnames